David Beck is an Australian drummer. Along with Jamie Oehlers and Paul Grabowsky he was nominated for ARIA Award for Best Jazz Album in 2008 with Lost And Found. He was a member of Australian jazz ensemble Frock from 1996-2016.

Discography

Albums

Awards and nominations

AIR Awards
The Australian Independent Record Awards (commonly known informally as AIR Awards) is an annual awards night to recognise, promote and celebrate the success of Australia's Independent Music sector.

|-
| 2008
|Lost and Found 
| Best Independent Jazz Album
| 
|-

ARIA Music Awards
The ARIA Music Awards is an annual awards ceremony that recognises excellence, innovation, and achievement across all genres of Australian music. 

! 
|-
| 2008
|Lost and Found 
| Best Jazz Album
| 
| 
|-

References

Australian musicians
Living people
Year of birth missing (living people)